Burkina Faso participated at the 2018 Summer Youth Olympics in Buenos Aires, Argentina from 6 October to 18 October 2018.

Athletics

Boys

Girls

Swimming

Burkina Faso qualified 2 competitors in swimming for the games.

Boys

Girls

References

2018 in Burkina Faso
Nations at the 2018 Summer Youth Olympics
Burkina Faso at the Youth Olympics